The Wyoming Monument is an American Revolutionary War monument and gravesite located in the Borough of Wyoming in Luzerne County, Pennsylvania.

History

Background 

The monument marks the location of the bones of victims from the Battle of Wyoming (also known as the Wyoming Massacre), which took place on July 3, 1778.  Local Patriots banded together to defend the area against a raid by Loyalist and indigenous forces. The engagement ended in defeat for the Patriots, and considerable brutality followed the battle. It was not until October 1778 that the commanding officer of Fort Wyoming (Wilkes-Barre) felt the area safe enough to return and begin recovery of the bodies.

Memorial 
The remains were gathered and interred in a common grave, only to be exhumed at public ceremonies in 1832 — ceremonies attended by some of the then elderly survivors of the battle. In 1833, the bones were re-interred in a vault under the present monument.

Each year, beginning in 1878 for the 100th anniversary of the battle, a commemorative ceremony is held on the grounds of the monument. The ceremony is sponsored by the Wyoming Commemorative Association. Ownership of the monument is held by the Wyoming Monument Association, originally formed as the Ladies Monumental Association.

On August 2, 2008, the monument was struck by lightning, causing some damage and putting the monument in need of repairs. In 2010, the restoration began and the monument, completely repaired and restored, was rededicated at the annual celebration of the Wyoming Commemorative Association in 2011.

Gallery

References

External links

Former President Jimmy Carter speaks at Wyoming Monument on May 28, 2013 (archived on C-SPAN)

Monuments and memorials on the National Register of Historic Places in Pennsylvania
Buildings and structures in Luzerne County, Pennsylvania
1833 sculptures
National Register of Historic Places in Luzerne County, Pennsylvania
1833 establishments in Pennsylvania